Tlayucan is a 1962 Mexican comedy film directed by Luis Alcoriza and based on a novel by Jesús Murciélago Velázquez. It was nominated for the Academy Award for Best Foreign Language Film.

Cast
 Julio Aldama as Eufemio Zárate
 Norma Angélica Ladrón de Guevara as Chabela
 Andrés Soler as Don Carlos
 Anita Blanch as Prisca
 Noé Murayama as Matías
 Juan Carlos Ortiz as Nico (as niño Juan Carlos Ortíz)
 Pancho Córdova as Sacristán
 Eric del Castillo as Doroteo
 Dolores Camarillo as Dolores (as Dolores Camarillo 'Fraustita')
 Antonio Bravo as Doctor
 Amado Zumaya as Máximo
 Joaquín Martínez

See also
 List of submissions to the 35th Academy Awards for Best Foreign Language Film
 List of Mexican submissions for the Academy Award for Best Foreign Language Film

References

External links

1962 films
1962 comedy films
1960s Spanish-language films
Films based on Mexican novels
Films directed by Luis Alcoriza
Mexican comedy films
1960s Mexican films